Ice shove, a heave of ice from an ocean or large lake onto the shore.
 Frost heaving, an upwards swelling of soil during freezing conditions caused by an increasing presence of ice as it grows towards the surface.